Bridgette is a feminine given name. It is a variant of Bridget. Notable people with the name include:

 Bridgette Andersen, American actress  
 Bridgette Crosby, fictional character in the DC Universe
 Bridgette DuBois, fictional character on Medium (TV series)
 Bridgette Gordon, American basketball player 
 Bridgette Gusterson, Australian water polo player
 Bridgette Jones, member of the London band Fluffy
 Bridgette Radebe, South African businesswoman
 Bridgette Wilson, American actress
 Bridgette, fictional character from the Total Drama series

See also
 Bridgette (game), a two-player variant of contract bridge.

References

Feminine given names